Gabal Sha'ib El Banat is a mountain in Egypt, situated in the Saharan Eastern Desert, 40 km from the Red Sea, between the cities of Hurghada and Safaga.

Geography
Gabal Sha'ib El Banat is the highest peak of the Eastern Desert mountain range, and is the highest peak of mainland Egypt (excluding the Sinai Peninsula).

Peaks
The group of peaks of the Shaiyb al-Banat is composed of four mountains:
 Gabal Abu Dukhan (1,705 m.),
 Gabal Qattar (or Gattar, 1,963 m.),
 Gabal Shayeb El-Banat (2,187 m.),
 Gabal Umm Anab (1,782 m.).

Seasonal rivulets on its slopes are from precipitation and springs.

People
The area of Gabal Sha'ib El Banat is mainly inhabited by the Ma'aza tribe, also known as Bani Attia, which is composed of about 4,000/5,000 people that live in an area of 90,000 km². These people are nomads and live with their chattel of sheep, goats, and dromedaries. The Bedouin Arab of Banu Hilal have lived in area between 11th and 12th centuries.

See also

List of Ultras of Africa

References

Mountains of Egypt
Red Sea Governorate
Sahara